Phạm Thị Trân Châu (born July 29, 1938) is a Vietnamese biochemist and former politician.

She was born in Dien Phong Commune, Điện Bàn District, Quảng Nam Province. She was educated at the University of Hanoi and, after graduation, became a biology professor at the University. In 1974, she received a PhD from the University of Łódź.

She received the Vietnam Kovalevskaya Award in 1988. She was elected president of the Intellectual Women's Association in 2011. She was given the title of "meritorious teacher". She was also named to the country's Labor Order, 2nd and 3rd class.

She was a representative in the Tenth National Assembly of Vietnam.

References 

1938 births
Living people
Vietnamese biochemists
Members of the National Assembly (Vietnam)
21st-century women scientists
Vietnam National University, Hanoi alumni
Academic staff of Vietnam National University, Hanoi